This is a list of Bangladeshi films that was released in 2012.

January–March

April–June

July–September

October–December

See also

List of Bangladeshi films
Dhallywood

References

External links 
 Bangladeshi films on Internet Movie Database

Film
Bangladesh
 2012